Alphonse Jobez (1 August 1813 - 13 May 1893) was a French businessman and politician. He was the manager of the Forges de Syam. He represented Jura in the National Constituent Assembly in 1848-1849 during the Second French Republic. He was the author of several books of political economy.

References

External links
 

1813 births
1893 deaths
People from Jura (department)